Charles-François des Montiers de Mérinville (born 2 Feb 1682 in Paris – 10 May 1746) was a French clergyman and bishop for the Roman Catholic Diocese of Chartres. He became ordained in 1710. He was appointed bishop in 1710. He died on 10 May 1746, at the age of 64.

References

18th-century French Roman Catholic bishops
1682 births
1746 deaths
Clergy from Paris